Stoney End may refer to:

 "Stoney End" (song), a 1966 song by Laura Nyro; Barbra Streisand's cover version is the most famous.
 Stoney End (Barbra Streisand album)
 Stoney End (Stone Poneys album)